Jason Peter Bowen (born 24 August 1972) is a Welsh former international footballer. During his career, he made over 500 league appearances and was capped twice by Wales in a career which started at Swansea City. He made over 100 league appearances for the club and played in their 1994 Football League Trophy Final victory over Huddersfield Town. In 1995, he was sold to Birmingham City for £350,000.

Playing career
Born and raised in Merthyr Tydfil, Bowen began his career at Swansea City, making his debut in the 1990–91 season under manager Terry Yorath, having signed professional forms in July 1990. In his five seasons at The Vetch he played 124 league games, scoring 26 goals, mostly under the management of Frank Burrows and captaincy of John Cornforth and helped the club to victory in the 1994 Football League Trophy Final, defeating Huddersfield Town on penalties. He also finished as the club's top goalscorer during the 1993–94 season, scoring 17 times in all competitions. Whilst at Swansea, he progressed from the Welsh schools and youth set-ups through to the full international squad, earning his first full cap from Mike Smith in a 2–1 win in Estonia in May 1994.

In July 1995, he then moved to Birmingham City for a fee of £350,000, where he remained for a further three years. He won his second Welsh cap in a 7–1 defeat in the Netherlands in 1996. He had a spell on loan at Southampton in September 1997 under manager Dave Jones, and made 3 appearances in the Premiership. It seemed that the move would be made permanent but the clubs were unable to agree a fee, so Bowen returned to Birmingham.

He then moved to Reading in December 1997 for a fee of £200,000, but he and four other players, including Welsh international teammate Andy Legg, fell out with manager Tommy Burns. The group were dubbed the "gang of five" and were forced to train away from the rest of the first team with the youth side. He returned to Wales in January 1999 where he spent five years with Cardiff City, reuniting with his former Swansea manager Frank Burrows, suffering one relegation but offsetting that with three promotions as Cardiff took off following the arrival of Sam Hammam. He was put on the transfer list by Cardiff in March 2004 and left the club by mutual consent the following month, having made just two league appearances for the "Bluebirds" during the 2003–04 season.

In July 2004 he joined Newport County, making his debut on 14 August 2004 at Havant & Waterlooville. He left Newport in the summer of 2008 and signed for Llanelli. Bowen also played for Cardiff City in the 2008 Screwfix Western Masters tournament, and was named player of the tournament.

Personal life
Bowen has three sons, including footballer Sam. Jaye played for the Cardiff City under-18 squad before being released, while Sam was previously with the first-team side and made his debut in 2021.

On 9 February 2023, it was announced that Bowen has been diagnosed with motor neurone disease.

Honours
Swansea City
 Football League Trophy winner: 1994

References

External links

Profile on Welsh Premier League website via archive.org
International stats at 11v11

1972 births
Living people
Footballers from Merthyr Tydfil
Welsh footballers
Wales under-21 international footballers
Wales international footballers
Association football wingers
Association football forwards
Swansea City A.F.C. players
Cardiff City F.C. players
Birmingham City F.C. players
Southampton F.C. players
Reading F.C. players
Newport County A.F.C. players
Llanelli Town A.F.C. players
English Football League players
Premier League players
Cymru Premier players
People with motor neuron disease